Linolelaidic acid is an omega-6 trans fatty acid (TFA) and is a cis–trans isomer of linoleic acid. It is found in partially hydrogenated vegetable oils. It is a white (or colourless) viscous liquid.

Nonconjugated TFAs are represented by elaidic acid and linolelaidic acid. Their presence is linked heart diseases. The TFA vaccenic acid, which is of animal origin, poses less of a health risk.

References

Fatty acids
Alkenoic acids